Jason David Boardman is Professor of Sociology at the University of Colorado Boulder, where he directs the Health and Society Program at the Institute of Behavioral Science. He is known for his research on the genetics of educational attainment.

References

External links
Faculty page

Living people
University of Colorado Boulder faculty
American sociologists
American demographers
University of California, Berkeley alumni
University of Texas at Austin College of Liberal Arts alumni
Year of birth missing (living people)